San Pawl Milqi is the ruin of a Roman-period agricultural villa and a pagan temple, the most extensive to have ever been unearthed in Malta. A christian church was built on site based on the pseudo-history and religious doctrine that the site has biblical connections. On site of a present chapel was a temple dedicated to the Greek God Apollo and a Roman villa. According to religious tradition the villa is where St. Publius, the governor and first bishop of Malta, welcomed St. Paul after his shipwreck.

Apart from a copied and translated scripture attributed to Saint Luke, of which original source is now lost and has been translated from languages to languages, there are no periodic authors that wrote about the shipwreck at the time and no temporary authors supplement the tradition. Since the myth was founded, authors were careful in their writings to suit the Christian scripture which says Melite (not Malta).

There is no archaeological evidence in support of Christian claims, and it is considered a word of mouth and misnomer by name dating to the middle ages. Evidence of Christian worship on the site only dates back to the building of the first chapel in the fourteenth century. According to Anthony Bonanno, archeological research in the entire area of St Paul’s Bay found no evidence of the Christian tradition related to the supposed shipwreck in the area.

History

The site has been in use since prehistoric times; a couple of tombs date back to the Zebbug and possibly the Borg in-Nadur phases of the Maltese Bronze Age.

The first building on the site was probably built in the Phoenician-Punic period, when the site was used intermittently for agriculture. A small number of structures remain from this period and one burial bears a neo-Punic inscription.

In the Roman period, the site’s position on the slopes of a fertile valley and vicinity to the Roman harbour at Salina meant that it was ideally suited to the production of olive oil.  The establishment was expanded; the original central courtyard was transformed into an industrial area. The trapetum (a rotating mill used to separate pips from olive fruit), anchor points and at least two presses can still be seen, as well as a set of settling vats used to purify oil.

Although large enough to have been the property of a rich aristocrat, the villa does not contain any residential quarters of any particular richness. The four rooms which can be identified as serving residential needs were, in fact, only decorated with painted wall plasters and common cocciopesto flooring.

The site was eventually reduced in size and surrounded by a thick fortification wall. This wall was erected circa the third century A.D. by the Romans as a mean for defence from invaders. Its fortified walls, constant water supply and good position meant that it was ideally located to control the nearby port and valleys.

During the Arab period the site was majorly destroyed due to sea invasions and attacks. The Arabs decided to use the remains to fortify the site with limited construction techniques.

A church was built on part of the site in the fourteenth century, but after more than a century it fell into disuse and in 1616 was replaced by a church dedicated to the welcoming of St. Paul. This church, which still stands today, is the oldest record connecting the site to the traditional event.

Excavation
Although the remains of the villa have long been well known, scientific excavations, led by the Missione Archeologica Italiana a Malta, did not commence until 1963. The final report on these excavations is yet to be published.

The site was included on the Antiquities List of 1925.

Today
Today, the site is managed by Heritage Malta and closed to the public except for annual occasions.

References

External links
National Inventory of the Cultural Property of the Maltese Islands

Archaeological sites in Malta
National Inventory of the Cultural Property of the Maltese Islands
Ancient Roman buildings and structures in Malta
Sites managed by Heritage Malta
Fortifications in Malta
Buildings and structures in St. Paul's Bay